Dairy House was a railway station in Newcastle, England.  It was opened in 1851 to serve the Seaton Suice Branch Line but was closed by 1862. The station was served by the Blyth and Tyne Railway.

References

Disused railway stations in Northumberland
Former North Eastern Railway (UK) stations
Railway stations in Great Britain opened in 1851
Railway stations in Great Britain closed in 1862
1851 establishments in England
1862 disestablishments in England